The 2015 Women's EuroHockey Nations Championship was the 12th edition of the women's field hockey championship organised by the European Hockey Federation. It was held from 22 to 30 August 2015 in the Queen Elizabeth Olympic Park, London, England.

England defeated Netherlands on penalty shuttles in the final, drawing initially 2-2, with goals from Lily Owsley and Sophie Bray. Defender Sam Quek was named Man of the Match in the final.

Qualified teams

Format
The eight teams were split into two groups of four teams. The top two teams advanced to the semifinals to determine the winner in a knockout system. The bottom two teams played in a new group against the teams they did not play in the group stage. The last two teams were relegated to the EuroHockey Nations Challenge.

Squads

Results

Preliminary round

Pool A

Pool B

Fifth to eighth place classification

Pool C

First to fourth place classification

Semifinals

Third and fourth place

Final

Notes

Statistics

Final standings

Awards

Goalscorers

References

External links

 
Women's EuroHockey Nations Championship
EuroHockey Championship
EuroHockey Championship
EuroHockey Championship
International sports competitions in London
International women's field hockey competitions hosted by England
EuroHockey Championship
Field hockey in London
Women 1
EuroHockey Championship
Field hockey at the Summer Olympics – Women's European qualification